Left-arm orthodox spin, Left-arm off spin also known as slow left-arm orthodox spin bowling, is a type of left-arm finger spin bowling in the sport of cricket.
Left-arm orthodox spin is bowled by a left-arm bowler using the fingers to spin the ball from right to left of the cricket pitch (from the bowler's perspective).

Left-arm orthodox spin bowlers generally attempt to drift the ball in the air into a right-handed batsman, and then turn it away from the batsman (towards off-stump) upon landing on the pitch. The drift and turn in the air are attacking techniques. The stock delivery of a left-arm orthodox spin bowler is the left-arm orthodox spinner.

The major variations of a left-arm orthodox  spin bowler are the topspinner (which turns less and bounces higher in the cricket pitch), the arm ball (which does not turn at all, drifts into a right-handed batsman in the direction of the bowler's arm movement; also called a 'floater') and the left-arm spinner's version of a doosra (which turns the other way).

Notable slow left-arm orthodox spin bowlers
Players listed below have been included as they meet specific criteria which the general cricketing public would recognise as having achieved significant success in the art of left-arm orthodox spin bowling. For example, leading wicket-takers, and inventors of new deliveries.
 Rangana Herath – 433 Test wickets 
 Daniel Vettori – 362 Test wickets and 305 ODI wickets
 Derek Underwood – 297 Test wickets
 Bishan Singh Bedi – 266 Test wickets
 Ravindra Jadeja – 250 Test wickets and 188 ODI wickets 
 Shakib Al Hasan - 215 Test wickets, 115 T20I wickets (including the most wicket taker of ICC T20 world cup by 47 wickets) and 277 ODI wickets
 Ravi Shastri – 151 Test wickets
 Keshav Maharaj - 129 Test Wickets
 Ashley Giles- 143 Test wickets
 Taijul Islam- 134 Test wickets
 Jess Jonassen – 109 WODI wickets and 71 WT20I wickets
 Sophie Ecclestone - 64 WT20I wickets
 Ajaz Patel - Only left-arm orthodox spinner to take 10 wickets in an innings of a Test Match
 Monty Panesar- 167 Test wickets
 Ashton Agar- Highest test score by a number 11 batsman

References

Cricket terminology
Bowling (cricket)
Articles containing video clips